Dark Politics, also known as Dark Politics, LLC, is a media and news company founded by Kuwaiti journalist and politician Bashar Al-Sayegh and a group of specialists in political and media work, after the Kuwaiti government made it possible to obtain official licenses to provide political and media services. It is registered in the United States and also in Kuwait.

Overview
In addition to its previous work, the company now does research, studies, and opinion polls, as well as publishing a monthly magazine called Dark Politics (ISSN 2789-3162). The magazine includes political topics and reports related to the current situation. The magazine also publishes parliamentary answers and reports of Kuwaiti National Assembly committees.

Fact Checking
The company launched a service to verify news and events on social networking sites Twitter and Instagram at the start of its business in an attempt by the company to provide documented and correct information to users of social media networks.

The service evolved from checking news and events to validating politicians' statements - ministers and representatives - and the authenticity of the information they proclaim, with the goal of informing citizens about the truth and validity of the statements.

References

External links
 

2018 establishments in Kuwait
Publications established in 2018
Arabic-language newspapers
Magazines published in Kuwait
Mass media in Kuwait